Vagno Célio do Nascimento Silva (born 20 May 1968) is a Brazilian former football defender, who retired from professional football in 2003.

He was nicknamed by fans "O Canhão do Brasileirão" (The Cannon of the Brazilian Championship) for his extremely potent right-foot shot. One of his shots was measured at  during a test organized by Globo Esporte.

Playing career 
Revealed in the small Americano - RJ in 1986, he won the Brazilian Championship playing for Vasco da Gama in 1989.

He got famous after scoring the goal (shooting a penalty) that gave the Copa do Brasil (Cup of Brazil) title for Internacional - RS at 1992.

The defender also played for Flamengo, Atlético Mineiro and Universidad Católica de Chile, between others. But it was in Corinthians that he achieved more titles in his career.  

While at Corinthians, Célio Silva agreed a £4 million move to Premier League champions Manchester United in July 1997. However, United could not obtain a work permit, as the Home Office claimed that, despite Silva being a regular for Brazil for the past two years, he hadn't played enough matches for Brazil, and the move fell through. United bought Henning Berg instead. 

He represented Brazil national football team in 11 matches, winning the Copa América title in 1997.

Honours 
 1987: Copa União
 1989: Brazilian Championship
 1988, 1999: Campeonato Carioca
 1991, 1992: Campeonato Gaúcho
 1992, 1995: Copa do Brasil
 1995, 1997: Campeonato Paulista
 1997: Copa América
 1999: Copa Mercosur
 2000: Campeonato Mineiro
 1988, 1989, 1996: Ramon de Carranza trophy

References

Living people
1968 births
Association football central defenders
Brazilian footballers
Brazilian football managers
Brazilian expatriate footballers
Expatriate footballers in France
Expatriate footballers in Chile
Brazilian expatriate sportspeople in France
Brazilian expatriate sportspeople in Chile
Campeonato Brasileiro Série A players
Ligue 1 players
1997 Copa América players
Copa América-winning players
Americano Futebol Clube players
CR Vasco da Gama players
Sport Club Internacional players
Stade Malherbe Caen players
Sport Club Corinthians Paulista players
Goiás Esporte Clube players
CR Flamengo footballers
Clube Atlético Mineiro players
Club Deportivo Universidad Católica footballers
Londrina Esporte Clube managers
Brazil international footballers
Sportspeople from Rio de Janeiro (state)